Kings County (2021 population 18,327) is located in eastern Prince Edward Island, Canada.

It is the province's smallest, most rural and least-populated county.  Kings County is also least dependent upon the agriculture industry compared with the other two counties, while being more heavily dependent on the fishery and forest industry.  Comparatively large parts of the county are still forested and it hosts the province's largest sawmill.  The only heavy industry, aside from forestry and industrial farming, is a small shipyard, although secondary manufacturing has been established in recent years.

The county was named by Capt. Samuel Holland in 1765 for King George III (1738–1820). As such, Kings County's shire town is Georgetown. The largest community within the town of Three Rivers.

Demographics 

Communities
Towns
Three Rivers
Souris
Municipalities
Annandale-Little Pond-Howe Bay
Central Kings
Eastern Kings
Morell
Murray Harbour
Murray River
Souris West
St. Peters Bay
Unincorporated
Fortune Bridge
Valleyfield
Indian reserves
Morell 2

See also
 Royal eponyms in Canada

References

External links
2006 Community Profile: Kings County, Prince Edward Island; Statistics Canada

 
Counties of Prince Edward Island